Alexandre Varga (born 7 December 1976) is a French actor.

Biography 
Thanks to his parents' work, Alexandre Varga traveled a lot in his childhood (Congo, Morocco, India, Greece). He studied acting in Belgium at 17 years and decided at 20 years to live in Paris to become an actor..

He began his career in films (Les 11 commandements, L'Été d'Olga) and series television (Sous le soleil, The Sopranos). Since 2007, he had recurrent roles in many French series television : Alice Nevers : Le juge est une femme, Candice Renoir, Cassandre.

Filmography

Films 
 2002 : L'Été d'Olga by Nina Grosse 
 2004 : Les 11 commandements by François Desagnat et Thomas Sorriaux

Short 
 2003 : Blues Stop by Alexandre Kyriakidis : Joseph
 2010 : Palak Panner by Sébastien Carfora : Sébastien Dufresne
 2014 : Stalemate by Lou De Bausset : Pierre Bilderberg

Television 
 2009 : L'Ombre d'un flic : Igor
 2010 : Un mari de trop : Grégoire de Rougemont
 2011 : L'Amour en jeu : Alex
 2015 : On se retrouvera : Gabriel

Serie TV 
 2003-2005 : Sous le soleil
 2006 : SOS 18 (Season 3, Episode 4) : Alexandre
 2006 : Sœur Thérèse.com (Season 5, Episode 5) : Olivier Jacques
 2006 : The Sopranos (Season 6, Episode 11 Cold Stones) : Michel
 2007 : Duval et Moretti (Season 1, Episode 13) : doctor
 2007 - 2013 : Alice Nevers : Le juge est une femme (Seasons 7 to 11) : Mathieu Brémont
 2007 : Sous le soleil (Season 13, Episode 36 & 37) : thief
 2008 : La vie est à nous (Season 1) : Jérôme Cramerr
 2008 : Section de recherches (Season 3, Episode 9) : Dubois
 2008 : R.I.S, police scientifique (Season 4, Episode 12) : Victor Barel
 2008 : Avocats et Associés (Season 11, Episode 4) : Lionel
 2008 : Sous le soleil (Season 13, Episode 14) : Jacques Mercier
 2011 : Josephine, Guardian Angel (Season 13, Episode 58 Liouba) : Laurent Pasquier
 2012 : Camping Paradis (Season 3, Episode 6) : Pierre
 2012 : Enquêtes réservées (Season 5) : Max Leterrier
 2012 : Le Sang de la vigne (Episode La Robe de Margaux) : Antoine Rinetti
 2013 : Nos chers voisins : Alex's cousin
 2013-2014 and 2017 : Candice Renoir (Season 1 et 2 et guest Season 5) : Hervé Mazzani
 2014 : Camping Paradis (Season 6, Episode 1) : Olivier
 2015 :  Nina (TV series) (Season 1, Episode 2) : Dr Delacroix
 2015 -.... : Cassandre, série : Pascal Roche
 2017 : Camping Paradis (Season 9, Episode 4 : Famille nombreuse, famille heureuse) : Stan
 2019 : Josephine, Guardian Angel  (Season 19, Episode 92 : L'incroyable destin de Rose Clifton) : Terrence Wyatt

References

External links 
 

1976 births
Living people
French male film actors
French male television actors